Clear Creek is a  tributary of the San Benito River in California, in the United States.  The creek is the site of Clear Creek Management Area, operated by the BLM, and is known for its mineral abundance. The headwaters area of the creek is the only known location of gem quality benitoite, the designated California State Gem.

In 1998 the creek was identified as containing high levels of mercury in excess of water quality standards.

See also
List of rivers of California

References

External links
Clear Creek Management Area

Rivers of San Benito County, California
Rivers of Northern California